Calephelis borealis, commonly known as the  northern metalmark, is a butterfly of the family Riodinidae. It ranges through western Connecticut south through west-central Pennsylvania; central Appalachians and Ohio River Valley. Isolated populations are also found in southwest Missouri and eastern Oklahoma. The habitat consists of open woodland streams near serpentine, shale or limestone barrens.

The wingspan is 29–32 mm. The wings are brown with wide orange borders and a dark median band. Adults are on wing from mid-June to late July in one generation per year.

The larvae feed on the leaves of Senecio obovatus and possibly Senecio aureus and Erigeron philadelphicus. Adults feed on nectar from flowers including butterflyweed, white sweet clover, goldenrod, ox-eye daisy, sneezeweed, and yarrow.

The species is listed as endangered in the Connecticut by state authorities.

The species overwinters in the larval stage in leaf litter.

References

Butterflies of North America
Butterflies described in 1866
Riodininae
Taxa named by Augustus Radcliffe Grote
Taxa named by Coleman Townsend Robinson